The 1996 Rexona Cup was a women's tennis tournament played on outdoor clay courts at the Am Rothenbaum in Hamburg in Germany  that was part of Tier II of the 1996 WTA Tour. The tournament was held from 29 April through 5 May 1996. First-seededArantxa Sánchez Vicario won the singles title.

Finals

Singles

 Arantxa Sánchez Vicario defeated  Conchita Martínez 4–6, 7–6, 6–0
 It was Sánchez Vicario's 6th title of the year and the 68th of her career.

Doubles

 Arantxa Sánchez Vicario /  Brenda Schultz-McCarthy defeated  Gigi Fernández /  Martina Hingis 4–6, 7–6, 6–4
 It was Sánchez Vicario's 7th title of the year and the 69th of her career. It was Schultz-McCarthy's 4th title of the year and the 13th of her career.

References

External links
 ITF tournament edition details
 Tournament draws

Rexona Cup
WTA Hamburg
1996 in German women's sport
1996 in German tennis